Samuel Brewer (1724 – 11 June, 1796) was an English dissenting clergyman who was minister at the Stepney Meeting House, London, from 1746 to 1796. He succeeded John Hubbard.

Life
When Brewer took over Stepney Meeting House, the congregation was quite small, but over the years he built it up. He was not sectarian maintaining friendly relations with Anglicans from the established church.

He was particularly friends with George Whitefield, and also very supportive to Samson Occom and  Nathaniel Whitaker during their visit to London to raise money for a Christian church in New Hampshire in British Colonial America.

George Ford provided his funeral oration.

His grandson was the hymnist James Edmeston.

References

1724 births
1796 deaths
People from Stepney
English Dissenters